Casa Grande is a Brazilian municipality located in the state of Minas Gerais. The city belongs to the mesoregion Metropolitana de Belo Horizonte and to the microregion of Conselheiro Lafaiete.  As of 2020, the estimated population was 2,254.

See also
 List of municipalities in Minas Gerais

References

Municipalities in Minas Gerais